Pablo Baltodano Monroy (born December 12, 1980 in Mexico City) is a diplomat and Mexican politician. He serves as Consul General of Nicaragua in Mexico, a position he has held since August 1, 2007. Monroy also served as President of Consuls in Mexico in 2009.

References

External links

Mexican diplomats
1980 births
Living people
Politicians from Mexico City